Union Cross is an unincorporated community in southeastern Forsyth County, North Carolina, United States. Parts of the community have been annexed by Kernersville and Winston-Salem as a result of the area's large population growth and the construction of the new Dell plant. The community holds Union Cross Traditional Academy, as well as Glenn High School.

Geography
Union Cross is located at  (36.048470 -80.118933). It is located southeast of Winston-Salem at the intersection of High Point Road, and Union Cross Road, north of Interstate 74. Its elevation is 978 feet (298 m).

References

Unincorporated communities in Forsyth County, North Carolina
Unincorporated communities in North Carolina
Geography of Winston-Salem, North Carolina